Arlenys Romero (born 7 February 1984) is a Cuban basketball player for Pinar del Río and the Cuban national team, where she participated at the 2014 FIBA World Championship.

She was a member of the team which competed for Cuba at the 2015 Pan American Games, winning a bronze medal.

References

1984 births
Living people
Cuban women's basketball players
Guards (basketball)
Basketball players at the 2015 Pan American Games
Pan American Games bronze medalists for Cuba
Pan American Games medalists in basketball
Competitors at the 2018 Central American and Caribbean Games
Central American and Caribbean Games silver medalists for Cuba
Central American and Caribbean Games medalists in basketball
Medalists at the 2015 Pan American Games
21st-century Cuban women
20th-century Cuban women